Living Villages is an organisation in the United Kingdom established in 1993 as part of The Athena Foundation UK (now dissolved) and as The Living Village Trust in 1997  by Carole Salmon and Bob Tomlinson. The objectives are to encourage sustainable development through appropriate design and ethical commercial practice. The first project of five environmentally friendly houses called Bells Court in Bishops Castle, Shropshire, UK built in 1997 and the 40 house eco-neighbourhood called The Wintles, also in Bishops Castle, demonstrate that new housing can be eco-friendly, attractive and beneficial  to a local community  provided that a specific set of design principles is adhered to.

Tomlinson and Salmon maintain that sustainability within the built environment is not possible unless the inhabitants feel a connection to the place and enjoy living there. For example, even if a building is highly energy efficient or made from environmentally friendly materials, it cannot be sustainable if it is demolished or radically altered because it is not liked by its occupants, or is not fit for purpose. Many new 'eco-buildings' suffer this fate at great environmental and social cost despite their acclaimed eco-credentials.

Therefore, it is vital that any new build environment is designed in such a way as to be attractive to the current users and flexible enough to be easily modified for future users.

The design code derived from the building of The Wintles is a step by step process which serves as a guide to the design of buildings and, perhaps more importantly, the spaces between the buildings, so that they have a good chance of being properly sustainable. The key component of this process is to study and learn from existing buildings and places that have proved over many generations to be well used and liked by their inhabitants. The job of the designer, urbanist or architect is then to take the best of these elements and improve them using contemporary methods without destroying the original character.

History 

1993 Living Villages established as a social enterprise configured as a not-for-profit company limited by guarantee after a proposal for an eco-village based on Permaculture principles and design inspired by Christopher Alexander's A Pattern Language attracted a number of supporters and potential householders.

1995 The purchase and refurbishment of the Six Bells pub in Bishops Castle provided the site for 5 eco-houses designed by architect Pat Borer and built by local environmentally friendly builders Ecostruct.

1999 The Wintles project started as a new pedestrian neighbourhood with a high degree of self-sufficiency for the town of Bishops Castle on 17 acres which included houses, shared gardens, allotments for food production, woodland and amenity areas which include a labyrinth orchard designed by Keith Critchlow. Architects Pat Borer and David Lee worked on the initial layout with contributions from Christopher Alexander and Leon Krier, but the final designs were produced by Bob Tomlinson and became the working model for the design principles. Ecostruct were the building partners.

2007 Living Villages won the Housebuilder of the Year Award for The Wintles. Other awards that year included Best Environmental Development and Best Landscape Award.

2009 Living Villages name bought by LXB Properties and several new projects are started with the Living Village Trust managing the design process with the design principles.

2013 The Wintles is cited as one of the UK Governments favourite housing schemes by Planning Minister Nick Boles MP.

References

External links 
 The Living Village Trust

Environmental organisations based in the United Kingdom
New Classical architecture